Philipp Gruissem (born 30 January 1987) is a German professional poker player from Krefeld.

Poker
Gruissem began playing live tournaments in 2009. He finished 28th in the 2011 World Series of Poker earning over $240,000. Gruissem's biggest live tournament cash is winning the 2014 European Poker Tour €25,000 High Roller event, earning $1,378,059.

Gruissem plays online under the nickname philbort. As of 2016, Gruissem live tournament winnings exceed $10,000,000 putting him 4th on the German all time money list behind Fedor Holz, Ole Schemion and Tobias Reinkemeier.

Personal life
Gruissem was born in Germany and currently resides in London. He co-founded the charity Raising for Effective Giving with fellow poker players Igor Kurganov and Liv Boeree.

References

External links 
Philipp Gruissem Hendon Mob profile

1987 births
German poker players
Living people